Kevin Fonteyne (born 1990) is an American actor from Portsmouth, New Hampshire. He stars as Johnny Cash on the CMT drama Sun Records.

Biography
Kevin was one of six children in a single-parent home. His mother is a retired Air Force military medical Senior Master Sergeant. He started acting at a young age, starring in school plays at Hallsville Elementary School in Manchester, New Hampshire. He graduated from Portsmouth High School in 2008. His TV career began with roles on iCarly, Criminal Minds, Monday Mornings, Bones, and NCIS. This led to larger roles like Matt on Masters of Sex and Marco on Melissa & Joey. When not acting, Kevin enjoys playing guitar, singing, and training his new pup Zeus. He currently resides in Los Angeles.

Filmography

Television

References

Living people
Male actors from New Hampshire
1990 births